Eduardo Pizarro Leongómez is the Ambassador of Colombia to the Netherlands. A sociologist and political analyst, he was a co-founder, former director, and professor of the Political Studies and Foreign Relations Institute of the National University of Colombia; he served as Presiding Member of the National Commission for Reparation and Reconciliation of Colombia, CNRR as a delegate of the Vice President of Colombia from 2005 to 2009; and is a member of the Board of Directors of the Trust Fund for Victims of the International Criminal Court.

Ambassadorship
On 19 September 2011, President Juan Manuel Santos Calderón announced the designation of Pizarro as the new Ambassador of Colombia to the Netherlands in replacement of Francisco José Lloreda Mera, who had been in the post since 2007.

He was sworn in as Ambassador on 2 December by Patti Londoño Jaramillo, Deputy Minister of Multilateral Affairs of the Ministry of Foreign Affairs of Colombia, and presented his Letters of Credence in a ceremony to Her Majesty Queen Beatrix of the Netherlands on 7 December at Noordeinde Palace in The Hague. Being dually accredited, Pizarro also presented his credentials as Permanent Representative of Colombia to the Organisation for the Prohibition of Chemical Weapons at The Hague on Thursday 19 January 2012 to Director General of the OPCW Ahmet Üzümcü. Ex officio, he was also Representative of Colombia to the Assembly of State Parties to the International Criminal Court, the Administrative Council of the Permanent Court of Arbitration, and the Common Fund for Commodities.

Personal life

Selected works

References

Further reading

External links
 

Date of birth missing (living people)
Living people
Place of birth missing (living people)
University of Paris alumni
University of Los Andes (Colombia) alumni
Universidad Externado de Colombia alumni
Colombian sociologists
Academic staff of the National University of Colombia
Ambassadors of Colombia to the Netherlands
Permanent Representatives of Colombia to the Organisation for the Prohibition of Chemical Weapons
Year of birth missing (living people)